The Roman Catholic Church in Guatemala forms a single, entirely Latin Episcopal conference.

It comprises two ecclesiastical provinces (each headed by a Metropolitan Archbishop, with a total of 11 suffragan dioceses), three missionary pre-diocesan jurisdictions: one territorial prelature and two Apostolic vicariates, each headed by a (residential or titular) Bishop.

The only former jurisdictions have been promoted to their present status.

Current Dioceses

Exempt missionary jurisdictions in Guatemala 
These are directly dependent on the Holy See, notably the Roman Congregation for the Evangelization of Peoples.
 Apostolic Vicariate of El Petén
 Apostolic Vicariate of Izabal
 Territorial Prelature of Santo Cristo de Esquípulas, held in personal union with Zacapa bishopric

Ecclesiastical province of (Santiago de) Guatemala 
 Metropolitan Archdiocese of (Santiago de) Guatemala
 Diocese of Escuintla
 Diocese of Jalapa
 Diocese of (San Francisco de Asís de) Jutiapa
 Diocese of Santa Rosa de Lima
 Diocese of Verapaz, Cobán
 Diocese of Zacapa (y Santo Cristo de Esquipulas)

Ecclesiastical province of Los Altos Quetzaltenango-Totonicapán 
 Metropolitan Archdiocese of Los Altos Quetzaltenango-Totonicapán
 Diocese of Huehuetenango
 Diocese of Quiché
 Diocese of San Marcos
 Diocese of Sololá-Chimaltenango
 Diocese of Suchitepéquez-Retalhuleu

Sources and external links 
 Catholic-Hierarchy entry.
 GCatholic.org.

Guatemala
Catholic dioceses